Kanō Michinobu (20 December 1730 – 24 September 1790) was a Japanese painter of the Kanō school of painting. He was the first appointed "inner painter" to the shōgun, to whom he remained close. Michinobu also used the art names Eisen, Eisen'in, and Hakugyokusai.

Life and career

Michinobu was born with the given name Shōzaburō on the 11th day of the 11th month of the year Kyōhō (20 December 1730) in Edo (modern Tokyo). He was the first son of the Kanō school painter Eisen Hisanobu (or Kanō Furonobu 1698–1731), who had taken over as head of the school from Kanō Tsunenobu in 1728 and who died in 1731, the year after Michinobu's birth. Jusen Harunobu was adopted into the family to carry on the line but also fell sick and died in 1731 at age 17. Michinobu was thus officially named to carry on the line. As he was an infant, he did not have an audience with the shōgun whom he was to serve until 1741.

Michinobu was prolific and ambitious and came to dominate the Kanō school. In the face of the rising popularity of popular art of the Nanpin school, Michinobu strove to revive the Kanō school's fading status and re-introduced the bold brush strokes of the school's Chinese-inspired roots.

He won the deep favour of the shōgun Tokugawa Ieharu (1737–86), to whom he remained close and who had Michinobu moved from his workshop in Takegawa to a mansion in Kobikichō in central Edo. The branch flourished and Michinobu instructed large numbers of students. Under Ieharu's influence the Kobikichō branch replaced the Nakabishi branch as the dominant branch of the Kanō school.

In 1762 the rank of hōgen—the second highest for Buddhist priests—was conferred on Michinobu. In 1763 he was made an "inner painter" ( oku-goyō eshi), a title Ieharu had created that year for painters appointed to paint the shōguns inner chambers and which gave the painter freedom to roam these chambers and personal access to the shōgun.

Michinobu lost influence after the death of Ieharu in 1786; the next shōgun Ienari's senior councilor Matsudaira Sadanobu described him as "an adept painter and remarkably proficient at securing the patronage of important persons" and favoured other outside painters.

On Michinobu's death in 1790 his son  (1753–1808) succeeded as the head of the Kanō school.

Legacy

Almost every major collection of Japanese art in the world has an example of Michinobu's prolific work. The  declares him "the last member of a great house" who had "to labour without stint". His work was highly praised and was often judged the greatest since Kanō Tan'yū's, though writer Ueda Akinari stated he could not "detect much to admire in him".  The shogunate retainer  considered Michinobu "a good painter" who was "compromised" by his ambitions and self-promotion.

The ukiyo-e artist Chōbunsai Eishi (1756–1829) appears to have studied under Michinobu. Eishi may have received his art name from Michinobu, though tradition holds the shōgun Ieharu bestowed it on him.

References

Works cited

External links
 

1730 births
1790 deaths
18th-century Japanese painters
Kanō school
Artists from Tokyo Metropolis